Breuil-Cervinia is a frazione of the comune of Valtournenche, and is considered one of the most renowned winter and summer tourist resorts in the Alps.

Etymology 
The name of Breuil-Cervinia is a fusion of two terms: Breuil, in French, the original name of the place before the tourist settlement was built, derived from Valdôtain dialect Breuill indicating a marshy mountain terrain, a very common toponym throughout the Aosta Valley; and Cervinia, the toponym that was given the town following the process of italianization of placenames in the Aosta Valley wanted by the fascist government, referring to the Cervin (fr.) or Cervino (it.), the Matterhorn.

Geography
It shares a ski area with Zermatt through the Plateau Rosa glacier.

The ski season in Breuil-Cervinia lasts not only 6 months in winter but also in summer on the Plateau Rosa glacier. The Theodul Pass lies on the territory of Breuil-Cervinia. The village is divided by the Marmore creek.

Climate
Breuil-Cervinia being one of Europe's highest ski resorts, its climate features low temperatures and consistent snow falls. This maintains the snow in great shape throughout the winter season.

History
Breuil-Cervinia has a short history. Until the beginning of the 19th century, the Breuil basin was just a pasture, with a group of shepherds living in a few alpine cottages only in summer. However, in the Middle Ages, the Breuil was an important crossroad for merchants who had to cross the Alps and for the settlement of the Walser community in the near the Ayas and Lys valleys.

The real growth of the town began since the 1850s, with the birth of alpinism all over the Alps. The explorations of Horace-Bénedict de Saussure through Savoy Alps in the 1700s enhanced the interest around Matterhorn and the other mountains of the Savoyard state, particularly in the English bourgeoisie, increasingly interested in wilderness.

Resident shepherds such as Jean-Antoine Carrel always looked upon his home mountain as something attainable and started to try the first attempts of ascent of Matterhorn from the south face. Many European mountain climbers saw the Matterhorn as one of the greatest challenges and the arrival to the Breuil of John Tyndall and Edward Whymper started the competition for the first complete ascent, also thanks to Jean-Antoine's knowledge of Breuil territory. The construction of some bases became necessary. Some examples are the first Refuge du Théodule (built in 1852) at 3317 m (10882.6 ft), the Jumeaux Hotel and the Hôtel du Cervin.

After years of collaboration with Jean-Antoine Carrel, the competition has been won by Edward Whymper in 1865, when he realised that the Hörnli ridge was easier to climb. Only three days later, Jean-Antoine Carrel was able to climb Matterhorn through the more difficult Lion ridge. After the disaster happened to Edward Whymper's ascent team on the north face returning to Zermatt, Amé Gorret, a fellow climber and fellow countryman of Jean-Antoine Carrel, realised the possibility of increasing the tourist passage to Breuil by building the first alpine refuge on the Matterhorn. So Amé Gorret asked the Italian Alpine Club to support his decision, which gave rise to the refuge, located at the Cravate (4,120 m) of the Matterhorn and inaugurated in 1867.

As a result of the exploratory drive and the newborn mountaineering movement, the Società Guide del Cervino (it.) / Société des guides du Cervin (fr.), one of the oldest mountain guide societies in the world, was founded in Breuil in 1865.

The first hotels began to be built in the area and the town began to develop from a simple alpine pasture to a tourist destination. With the emergence of ski mountaineering, the Breuil slopes became the destination of the first skiers, accelerating the transformation into a top tourist destination.

A number of entrepreneurs from Piedmont, driven by the desire to build new hydroelectric plants on behalf of the Società Idroelettrica Piemontese, explore the side valleys of the Aosta Valley, including the Valtournenche Valley. During the explorations and the first construction of hydroelectric plants in the lower part of the Valtournenche Valley, the entrepreneur and engineer Dino Lora Totino saw in Breuil the possibility of creating a first-class tourist resort. In 1934, together with other Piedmontese entrepreneurs, Dino Lora Totino founded the Società Anonima Cervino, with the aim of transforming Breuil into an important tourist destination by building modern ski lifts.

In 1934, the road connecting the main town of Valtournenche, Pâquier, to Breuil was built. Two years later, the Breuil - Plan Maison cable car (2,555 m) was inaugurated.

During 1939 Breuil was renamed Cervinia because of the fascist project of Italianization of Aosta Valley's toponyms. 1939 also had been the year of a big venture: the highest skilift in Italy was opened, linking Plan Maison with the Testa Grigia at 3480 m (11417 ft), near the Swiss border. An observatory for cosmic ray physics and the physics of the Earth's atmosphere was also built near Plateau Rosa and is now used as a meteorological station run by the Italian Air Force.

After the World War II, the first ski lifts were built around Breuil-Cervinia and Plan Maison. In 1952, again at the instigation of Dino Lora Totino, a new cable car was built from Plan Maison to Furggen. It was a single-span cable car, and was so long that the designer had to take the curvature of the Earth into account when designing it. The cableway and its associated slope were so impervious that, following the death of several people who had fallen from the Furggen, it was necessary to build a tunnel onto the mountain, which would make it easier for skiers and the operators of the Società Cervino to descend to the glacier below, avoiding the more inexperienced skiers from having to use the more exposed part of the slope.

Also in the 1950s, Breuil-Cervinia, Plateau Rosa and the Matterhorn were chosen by the Italian Alpine Club and Ardito Desio as locations to prepare the famous 1954 K2 expedition, which included Achille Compagnoni and Walter Bonatti.

In 1961, the Plan Maison-Cime Bianche-Plateau Rosa cable car was replaced by a new system built by Piemonte Funivie. In 1963, the Breuil-Plan Maison cable car, the first cable car to be built in Breuil-Cervinia, was replaced by a new, large cable car, and a second cable car was built next to it in order to double the hourly capacity of the ski lifts.

In 1962, the "Lac Bleu" bobsleigh track was completed near the Lago Blu and inaugurated by Olympic champion Eugenio Monti.

In 1972, the first two-seater chairlift was built at Cielo Alto. The unification in 1982 with the Valtournenche ski resort added prestige to Cervinia. In 1986, the Breuil-Plan Maison 1 cable car was replaced by a 6-passenger gondola lift and in 1988, the long Plan Maison-Laghi Cime Bianche gondola lift was opened. In 1991 the Plateau Rosa cable car was replaced by a cable car with 140-passenger cabins.

In 1993, the Furggen cable car was closed and abandoned, as it was hardly used due to the wind and also heavily damaged in an accident.

In the 2000s, the Società Cervino encountered considerable financial difficulties and was unable to invest in the station. In 2006, thanks to regional funding, it was possible to build two modern chairlifts, called Crétaz and Campetto, to replace the old ski lifts. In 2008, increasing financial difficulties led the Cravetto family, the historic owners of the Breuil-Cervinia ski lifts, to decide to sell its majority shares in Società Cervino. These were bought by the Autonomous Region of Valle d'Aosta (about 70%; the remaining 30% was managed by private individuals), and the company thus became public, like most of its Valle d'Aosta counterparts operating in the sector. The first step of the new management towards modernisation was taken in 2009, with the inauguration of the Pancheron hexapost chairlift. In 2012 the Plateau Rosa cable car is renewed.

Thanks to its rapid growth, Cervinia and its ski resort, as many other town on the Alps like Courmayeur, Chamonix-Mont-Blanc, Limone Piemonte, Pila, Sestriere, Zermatt, Sankt Moritz, became a field of architectural and engineering experimentation, trying to develop a new alpine architecture and new technologies for buildings and lifts. Examples of this research are the Cielo Alto buildings, the Casa del Sole, the original Refuge du Théodule, the Pirovano hut and, as far as ski lifts are concerned, the Breuil-Plan Maison cable car and the Gran Baita hotel, the Plateau Rosa cable car, the Plan Maison - Monte Furggen cable car. The architects who oversaw the urban development of the town include important names such as Carlo Mollino, Francesco Dolza, Giovanni Muzio, Franco Albini and Mario Galvagni.

Economy 
Today Breuil-Cervinia is fully dependent on tourism, both during winter and summer, thanks to the possibility of summer ski on the Plateau Rosa Glacier and the ski lifts links of Matterhorn Ski Paradise, the beauty of its alpine landscape and the presence of the Matterhorn.

In summer, the plains of Breuil-Cervinia are home to alpine pastures with cows whose milk is used to produce the first Aosta Valley cheese, Fontina, and other toma cheeses.

Monuments and points of interest

Locations 

 Lago Blu (it.) / Lac Bleu or Lac de Layet (fr.).
 Lac de Goillet, artificial lake nearby Cime Bianche lift station.
 Plateau Rosa.
 Plan Maison.
 Furggen arrival lift station and panorama.
 Refuge Jean-Antoine Carrel.
 Refuge Duc des Abruzzes à l'Oriondé.

Religious buildings 

 Notre-Dame-des-Ermites chapel, built in the 16th century.
 Notre-Dame-des-Neiges church, built in the 1950s.
 Saint Anne and Pope John Paul II chapel.
 Alpini chapel.
 Croce del Papa (it.) / Croix du Pape (fr.), a monument dedicated to Pope John Paul II.
 Croix Carrel, a monument dedicated to Jean-Antoine Carrel, remembering the place where he died.

Museums 

 Luigi Amedeo Hut, the Matterhorn mountain hut dedicated to Luigi Amedeo di Savoia, replaced by Jean-Antoine Carrel Hut, and converted in a museum.

Sports

Alpine skiing 
The ski area is very large and guarantees good snow quality during the season, being at a high altitude (2,050 m to 3,500 m).

Breuil-Cervinia is connected, weather permitting, with Zermatt (when the Italian lifts are open) via the Plateau Rosa glacier, where summer skiing is also practised, and with the part of the Valtournenche ski resort via the Cime Bianche mountain pass.

Breuil-Cervinia hosted the Women's Alpine Ski World Cup in the 1977–1978 season on 10 December 1977, the first time in the history of the alpine resort, with a slalom stage on the Cielo Alto slope. The competition was won by French skier Perrine Pelen, followed by her compatriot Fabienne Serrat and Hanni Wenzel, who won the general and the slalom rankings for the season.

From the 2022–2023 season, Breuil-Cervinia and Zermatt (Switzerland) will host a cross-border stage of the Alpine Ski World Cup. This will be the first time in the history of the Cup. The races to be held will be downhill and super-g, both men's and women's. The designated slope is the Gran Becca, the result of a mixture of several slopes in the Matterhorn Ski Paradise resort: the athletes will start from the 3,899 m of the Gobba di Rollin, a mountain in Swiss territory, will take the Ventina slope, in Italian territory, and will arrive near the Cime Bianche Laghi - Plateau Rosa cable car station. The name Gran Becca is Matterhorn in Valle d'Aosta dialect.

A special and spectacular event related to alpine skiing in Breuil-Cervinia was Azzurrissimo, a skiing competition held on the Ventina slope, 11 kilometres long and delimited by the symbolic number of 100 gates. Ski clubs, sports centres, military sports groups, but also ordinary people, show business people, journalists and athletes took part in the event. The spirit of the competition was based on the confrontation of all against all on skis, mixing the different disciplines of alpine skiing in a single event. It became an international event, with the participation of athletes from different nations and the creation of a network of events twinned with Azzurrissimo in Crans-Montana and Baqueira-Beret. The first edition of Azzurrissimo was in 1987 and the tenth and last was in 1998. It was run in the first few days of May, at the end of the racing season and at the end of the various championships. This allowed the presence of big names in the discipline and the awarding of the prize for the "fastest ski club in Italy".

Cross-country skiing 
In winter Breuil-Cervinia hosts a cross-country skiing trail on the plains near the town centre.

Snowboard cross 
Breuil-Cervinia has hosted the Snowboard Cross World Cup four times, in the 2018, 2019, 2020 and 2022 seasons, making it a fixed stop on the circuit. Breuil-Cervinia was also supposed to host a stage in the 2021 season, which was cancelled due to the Coronavirus pandemic.

Cycling 
Breuil-Cervinia has hosted a stage of the most famous cycling race in Italy Giro d'Italia five times, in 1960, 1997, 2012, 2015 and 2018.

The streets of Breuil-Cervinia have also hosted several editions of the Giro Ciclistico della Valle d'Aosta, an event dedicated to the under-23s road cyclists and which has launched many internationally renowned cyclists such as Ivan Gotti and Fabio Aru.

In summer, downhill biking can be practised on equipped trails. The Maxiavalanche competition, which is organised around August and consists of a descent from the 3500 m of the Plateau Rosa glacier to Breuil-Cervinia, is well known. In 2011, two more tracks were added, bringing the number of downhill and freeride tracks to four. As of 2014, the number of trails is nine, including those that run towards the village of Valtournenche. The resort is relying heavily on this activity to boost summer tourism.

Bobsleigh 
The "Lac Bleu" bobsleigh run was located in Breuil-Cervinia and hosted the World Championships three times: in 1971, 1975 and 1985; it also hosted the European Championships on four occasions: in 1969, 1973, 1987 and 1991. In 1991, it was definitively closed down due to the very high running costs and the cost of renovations that the track would have had to undergo.

The bobsleigh track could have been an Olympic facility on two occasions: first, when the city of Aosta was bidding to host the 18th Winter Olympics in 1998, which was then awarded to the city of Nagano. The second was when the facility was considered for the bobsleigh, skeleton and luge competitions of the XX Winter Olympics in Turin in 2006, but the choice was made to build the Olympic facility in Cesana Pariol.

Speed skiing 
Breuil-Cervinia was the scene of several editions of speed skiing competitions. The slope was often the only one on the circuit that allowed new records to be set in the discipline.

Zeno Colò set a record of 159.291 km/h here in 1947 that stood for 13 years, using normal skis and skiing without a helmet. Even Steve McKinney, the first person to break 200 km/h on skis, ran speed skiing competitions in Breuil-Cervinia.

In 2005, the Speed Skiing World Championships were held in Breuil-Cervinia.

Ski touring 
Ski touring in Breuil-Cervinia is a real symbol. Before the ski lifts were built, the ski fields were invaded by ski tourers starting from Breuil-Cervinia, arriving at Plan Maison and, for the most experienced and daring, reaching Plateau Rosa, before descending back into the valley.

Breuil-Cervinia, together with Gressoney-La-Trinité, hosts one of the oldest and most historic ski touring competitions: the Trofeo Mezzalama.

Events 
Since 1998, Breuil-Cervinia hosts the Cervino CineMountain, a film festival focusing on mountain, adventure, exploring and nature documentaries. Cervino CineMountain is a member of the International Alliance for Mountain Film and awards the Oscar for the best mountain film from the various mountain film festivals that are members of the Alliance. The Cervino CineMountain also awards Grand Prizes, prizes for feature, medium and short films and for animated films.

Since 2019, in the month of July, Breuil-Cervinia hosts La Settimana del Cervino, an event that encourages contact with nature, environmental sustainability and respect for the mountain environment with a series of cultural meetings between people from the entertainment industry, athletes, experts on the subject of mountains and nature, as well as evening shows, concerts and walks aimed at raising awareness of the aforementioned subjects around the village of Breuil-Cervinia.

Notes and references
 Official website 
 Breuil-Cervinia Downhill Snow Report from Aosta valley official website 

Cities and towns in Aosta Valley
Frazioni of Aosta Valley
Ski areas and resorts in Italy